The following is a list of established day keelboat classes designed before 1970.

One-design classes

Development classes

See also
Classic dinghy classes
Olympic sailing classes
List of sailing boat types

Notes

References